Geoffrey Doumeng (born 9 November 1980 in Narbonne) is a French football midfielder who has played in both France and Thailand.

Honours
Montpellier
UEFA Intertoto Cup: 1999

References

External links 
 
 

1980 births
People from Narbonne
AS Nancy Lorraine players
French footballers
Living people
Ligue 1 players
Ligue 2 players
Montpellier HSC players
Valenciennes FC players
RC Lens players
Tours FC players
Expatriate footballers in Thailand
Association football midfielders
Sportspeople from Aude
French expatriate sportspeople in Thailand
Footballers from Occitania (administrative region)